James Bassett may refer to:

James Bassett (author) (1912–1978), American newspaper editor and author
James Bassett (missionary) (1834–1906), Canadian-born American Presbyterian missionary
James P. Bassett (born 1956), American lawyer and justice of the New Hampshire Supreme Court

See also
James Basset ( 1526–1558), Member of the Parliament of England
Ted Bassett (executive) (born 1921 as James Edward Bassett), American executive in law enforcement and horse racing